Fasten Your Seatbelt (lit. "Rollercoaster") is a 2013 South Korean comedy film written and directed by actor Ha Jung-woo, in his directorial debut. The film made its world premiere at the 18th Busan International Film Festival, and was released in theaters on October 17, 2013.

Plot
A plane headed from Tokyo's Haneda Airport to Seoul's Gimpo Airport with a Hallyu star on board runs into an unexpected storm and is in danger of crashing. A plane full of absurd characters―both crew members and passengers such as a businessman, a monk and a paparazzo—go through a series of comical shenanigans.

Cast
Jung Kyung-ho as Ma Joon-gyu
Ha Sung-chun as Han Gi-beom, captain
Kim Jae-hwa as Kim Hwal-ran, head stewardess
Choi Kyu-hwan as Kim Hyeon-gi, tabloid reporter
Kim Gi-cheon as Heo Seung-bok, Zha Cai Airlines chairman
Kim Byeong-ok as monk
Kang Shin-chul as Kang Shin-choo, chief purser
Kim Sung-kyun as Jo-rong, steward
Ko Sung-hee as Minamito, Japanese stewardess
Kim Ye-rang as Chan-mi, stewardess
Lee Ji-hoon as ophthalmologist
Son Hwa-ryung as Chun-nyeo, chairman's executive assistant
Hwang Jung-min as Cha Bok-soon, middle-aged female fan
Im Hyun-sung as co-pilot
Kang Han-na
Kim Joon-kyu
Lee Soo-in
Kim Jae-young
Ko Kyu-pil as Ma Joon-gyu's manager

Production
Ha Jung-woo said he'd always had the desire to study about film more, so he seized the opportunity to approach this movie not as an actor but as a director. "Having pondered what kind of film I should make, I came to the conclusion that I would only be satisfied if the audience could enjoy it and get some laughs. This naturally led me to write a comedy," Ha said.

Ha reportedly wrote the script based on his friend and fellow actor Ryoo Seung-bum's real-life experience. The flight from Seoul to Tokyo normally only takes about two hours, but Ryoo once experienced plane turbulence that went on for almost seven hours, during which he genuinely thought he was going to die.

Ha cast Jung Kyung-ho in the leading role as an arrogant and paranoid Hallyu star. Ha and Jung belong to the same agency Fantagio, and were both theater majors at Chung-Ang University. This was Jung's first acting job after his discharge from mandatory military service, and his character's appearance and wardrobe was inspired by K-pop star G-Dragon. Most of the actors in the cast have also worked with Ha before—even the music director, a colleague he first met while working on My Dear Enemy in 2008.

The film was shot in 20 days, and producer Kwon Nam-jin described Ha as a director who makes "quick and rational decisions" while making the atmosphere on the set bright and funny. In order to build a strong ensemble, one of Ha's casting conditions was to read the screenplay every day with the entire cast for two months, conducting intensive rehearsals as if they were preparing for a stage play.

Box office
Though ultimately not a big hit, due to its low budget Fasten Your Seatbelt broke even in just four days, attracting 200,000 viewers in the first six days of its release.

Awards and nominations

References

External links
 

South Korean comedy films
2013 films
South Korean aviation films
2013 comedy films
2013 directorial debut films
2010s South Korean films